The UWC Tag Team Championship is a tag team championship in the United Wrestling Coalition promotion. Being a professional wrestling championship, it is not won via direct competition; it is instead won via a predetermined ending to a match or awarded to a wrestler because of a wrestling angle.  It became official title on March 21, 1998 when Mr. Meaner and The Menace were awarded the titles. The championships are currently held by D-Generation Fat (Grim & Tommy Salami, who are in their first reign as champions.

Title lineage

List of combined reigns

By wrestler

See also
UWC Heavyweight Championship
UWC United States Championship
List of UWC Championships

References

Tag team wrestling championships
United Wrestling Coalition championships